Shovelton is an English surname. Notable people with the surname include:

Geoffrey Shovelton (1936-2016), English  opera singer and illustrator
Helena Shovelton (born 1945), British civil servant
Patrick Shovelton (1919–2012)), British civil servant

English-language surnames